The Philtower Building is a historic building located at 427 South Boston Avenue in Tulsa, Oklahoma.

Description and history 
Completed in 1928, it was designed by Edward Buehler Delk and financed by renowned oilman and dedicated philanthropist Waite Phillips (1883–1964). Associated architects Keene & Simpson performed architectural supervision in the construction of the building. In 1941, Phillips deeded the Philtower Building to the Boy Scouts of America (BSA), along with most of his Philmont Ranch and Villa Philmonte. The income from the building was used to help support Philmont. In 1977, the BSA sold the Building to a group of local investors. This group, The Philtower LLC, is the current owner. It is an example of neo-gothic and art deco architecture.

According to the Tulsa Preservation Commission, the building represents the Gothic Revival architecture style. A notable feature is the illuminated, sloping tiled roof. The office on the 21st floor that was used by Waite Phillips has been preserved.

Originally built as a high-rise office building, floors 12–20 were converted to loft apartments in 2004, making the Philtower Tulsa's first mixed use high-rise. The building has 24 floors and is 323 feet tall.

It was listed on the National Register of Historic Places in 1979. It was included in the Oil Capital Historic District on December 13, 2010.

See also
List of tallest buildings in Tulsa

References

External links
Philtower Official Site
Philtower at Skyscraper Page
 Voices of Oklahoma interview with Elliot "Chope" and Virginia Phillips. First person interview conducted on May 5, 2009, with Elliot "Chope" and Virginia Phillips, son and daughter-in-law of Waite Phillips. Original audio and transcript archived with Voices of Oklahoma oral history project.

Commercial buildings on the National Register of Historic Places in Oklahoma
Art Deco architecture in Oklahoma
Office buildings completed in 1928
Residential skyscrapers in Tulsa, Oklahoma
Historic district contributing properties in Oklahoma
1928 establishments in Oklahoma
National Register of Historic Places in Tulsa, Oklahoma